Lewis Murphy is an English professional rugby league footballer who plays as a er for Wakefield Trinity in the Super League.

Playing career
Murphy signed a professional contract with Wakefield in July 2021 having come through their academy and impressing at U19 level.

Murphy made a quick impression in his first season, scoring seven tries in his first 13 appearances in the Super League. He scored a hat-trick for Wakefield against Hull F.C. on 19 August 2022 including an acrobatic first, in a triumph which all but secured his relegation threatened club with their Super League status for the 2023 season.
In round 26 of the 2022 Super League season, Murphy scored four tries for Wakefield in their 34-18 victory over an understrength St Helens RFC team.
On 7 March 2023, Murphy was ruled out for the remainder of the 2023 Super League season with an ACL injury.

Style of play
Former Wakefield Trinity coach Willie Poching described Murphy as not the biggest player to play on the wing but his main attributes are his speed and agility. He has been described as possessing “pace to burn” with the athleticism to be a threat in the air and the potential to cover several roles in a squad.

References

External links
Wakfield Trinity profile

2002 births
Living people
English rugby league players
Rugby league wingers
Wakefield Trinity players